Beddgelert Fault First reported in a Memoir of the British Geological Survey activity ref. Ramsay 1881. It is a SW-NE trending volcanotectonic fault in North Wales that formed part of a graben system within the collapsed Snowdon caldera structure.  It was a focus for later felsic intrusions and hydrothermal activity.

See also
 List of geological faults of Wales

References

Geology of Wales